Kalita Elton Leighton (September 13, 1871 – January 10, 1928) was an American attorney, a federal judge, and college football player and coach.

College football career
Leighton played college football at the University of Iowa, where he was a law student, from 1894 to 1896. He served as the team captain of the 1895 Iowa Hawkeyes football team.

In 1898, Leighton served as the head football coach at the University of Northern Iowa – then known as Iowa State Normal School - compiling a record of 4–0–1.

Legal career
In 1911, Leighton was appointed to as a judge of the Eighth Judicial District by the Governor of North Dakota, John Burke, and in 1920, he was appointed as Assistant Attorney General of North Dakota

Head coaching record

References

External links
 

1871 births
1928 deaths
19th-century players of American football
20th-century American judges
American football guards
Iowa Hawkeyes football players
Northern Iowa Panthers football coaches
University of Iowa College of Law alumni
People from Putnam County, Missouri
Players of American football from Missouri